The Japan Society of Photogrammetry and Remote Sensing (JSRS) is a Japanese learned society devoted to photogrammetry and remote sensing.
It is a member of the International Society for Photogrammetry and Remote Sensing.  
ISRS publishes the Journal of the Japan Society of Photogrammetry and Remote Sensing.

See also
 American Society for Photogrammetry and Remote Sensing
 International Society for Photogrammetry and Remote Sensing

References

Photogrammetry organizations
Remote sensing organizations
Learned societies of Japan